Sita KC(Nepali: सिता के सी) born on 22 March 1990 is a Nepali singer from Baglung, Nepal. She has published more than 150 songs until now.

About and Career 
Sita KC is a Nepali singer from Baglung, Nepal. She started her singing carrier with 'malai America yei'. This song was very popular in Nepal. Chhalchhal Pani Gagrima, Piratiko Dori, and Yo Dashain Tiharma  are some popular songs of hers. She is actively involved music industry from 2064 BS/2008 AD until now. She was awarded an Image Award and a National Music Awards.

References 

Nepali-language singers
21st-century Nepalese women singers
Living people
1990 births